Tyrone Brown (born November 5, 1942) is an American attorney and retired government official. From 1977 to 1981, Brown served as a member of the Federal Communications Commission (FCC). Brown is currently a consulting counsel at Wiley Rein LLP, a law firm based in Washington, D.C.

Early life and education
Brown was born on November 5, 1942 in Norfolk, Virginia and grew up in East Orange, New Jersey. In 1960, Brown graduated from East Orange High School. He received an A.B.  from Hamilton College.  In 1967, he graduated with a LL.B. with distinction from Cornell Law School, where he was Managing Editor of the Cornell Law Review.

Career

Law career 
After graduation, he served as a law clerk for Chief Justice Earl Warren of the Supreme Court of the United States during the 1967-1968 Term. In 1968, Brown joined Covington & Burling's Washington D.C. office. From 1970, he held a series of federal government appointments and staff positions at the United States Senate, and then several corporate posts in publishing. From 1974 to 1977, he was an attorney at Caplin & Drysdale in Washington, D.C.

Federal Communications Commission (FCC) 
In 1977, President Jimmy Carter appointed Brown to the Federal Communications Commission, succeeding Benjamin Hooks. Initially, Brown declined the offer for the 21 months left on the term over concern on reappointment. Hamilton Jordan, an aide to Carter, persuaded Brown to accept. After approval by the Senate, Brown began his term on November 15, 1977, while continuing his participation in civil rights advocacy.

One of his goals as commissioner was to increase minority ownership of broadcasting stations. In 1978, he opposed dropping "public interest" from the FCC's consideration for broadcast licenses. On June 11, 1979, Carter nominated Brown for reappointment to the FCC for a seven-year term and he was confirmed. On January 31, 1981, Brown resigned from the Commission following the election of President Ronald Reagan, and was replaced by Mark S. Fowler.

Post-FCC career 
Later, Brown practiced law at Steptoe & Johnson and at Wiley Rein LLP, as well as serving as president of the Media Access Project from 2010 to 2013.

See also
 List of law clerks of the Supreme Court of the United States (Chief Justice)

References

External links

 The HistoryMakers video oral history with Tyrone Brown (2016).
 Interview of Tyrone Brown (15:52 mins), Cornell Law School, April 14, 1988.

1942 births
Living people
East Orange High School alumni
Politicians from East Orange, New Jersey
Politicians from Norfolk, Virginia
20th-century American lawyers
21st-century American lawyers
Hamilton College (New York) alumni
Cornell Law School alumni
Law clerks of the Supreme Court of the United States
Lawyers from Washington, D.C.
Members of the Federal Communications Commission
African-American lawyers
Carter administration personnel
Reagan administration personnel